Danny Lenie (born 17 October 1967) is a Belgian former professional footballer who played as a centre-back.

References

1967 births
Living people
Belgian footballers
Royal Cappellen F.C. players
R.E. Mouscron players
Association football defenders
Belgian Pro League players
Hoogstraten VV players
People from Schoten
Footballers from Antwerp Province